Leon Billewicz (April 25, 1870 in Werbiczna – April 1940) was a Polish officer and a General of the Polish Army. He was murdered during the Katyń massacre.

Biography

Service 
Initially serving with the Imperial Russian Army, in November 1918 he joined the Polish forces. In the Polish-Bolshevik War of 1919-1920 he commanded the Polish 13th Infantry Brigade. In 1919 he was promoted to the rank of Generał brygady (Brigadier general). After the Peace of Riga he remained in active service and, until 1927, served as a commanding officer of the Brześć Fortified Area. In April 1927, he retired from active service.

Katyń massacre

After the Invasion of Poland in 1939 he was arrested by the NKVD and imprisoned in Soviet Union. Interned in the Starobielsk concentration camp, he was murdered in Kharkov in April 1940, at the age of seventy, during the Katyń massacre. Among the Katyn victims were 14 Polish generals including Bronisław Bohatyrewicz, Xawery Czernicki (admiral), Stanisław Haller, Aleksander Kowalewski, Henryk Minkiewicz, Kazimierz Orlik-Łukoski, Konstanty Plisowski, Rudolf Prich (murdered in Lviv), Franciszek Sikorski, Leonard Skierski, Piotr Skuratowicz, Mieczysław Smorawiński and Alojzy Wir-Konas (promoted posthumously).

References

1870 births
1940 deaths
People from Volyn Oblast
People from Volhynian Governorate
Russian military personnel of World War I
Polish generals
Katyn massacre victims
Polish people of the Polish–Soviet War
Polish military personnel killed in World War II
Polish Army officers
Polish prisoners of war
World War II prisoners of war held by the Soviet Union
Imperial Russian Army personnel
People from the Russian Empire of Polish descent
Leon